Sodium nitrate is the chemical compound with the formula . This alkali metal nitrate salt is also known as Chile saltpeter (large deposits of which were historically mined in Chile) to distinguish it from ordinary saltpeter, potassium nitrate. The mineral form is also known as nitratine, nitratite or soda niter.

Sodium nitrate is a white deliquescent solid very soluble in water. It is a readily available source of the nitrate anion (NO3−), which is useful in several reactions carried out on industrial scales for the production of fertilizers, pyrotechnics, smoke bombs and other explosives, glass and pottery enamels, food preservatives (esp. meats), and solid rocket propellant. It has been mined extensively for these purposes.

History
The first shipment of saltpeter to Europe arrived in England from Peru in 1820 or 1825, right after that country's independence from Spain, but did not find any buyers and was dumped at sea in order to avoid customs toll. With time, however, the mining of South American saltpeter became a profitable business (in 1859, England alone consumed 47,000 metric tons). Chile fought the War of the Pacific (1879–1884) against the allies Peru and Bolivia and took over their richest deposits of saltpeter. In 1919, Ralph Walter Graystone Wyckoff determined its crystal structure using X-ray crystallography.

Occurrence

The largest accumulations of naturally occurring sodium nitrate are found in Chile and Peru, where nitrate salts are bound within mineral deposits called caliche ore. Nitrates accumulate on land through marine-fog precipitation and sea-spray oxidation/desiccation followed by gravitational settling of airborne NaNO3, KNO3, NaCl, Na2SO4, and I, in the hot-dry desert atmosphere. El Niño/La Niña extreme aridity/torrential rain cycles favor nitrates accumulation through both aridity and water solution/remobilization/transportation onto slopes and into basins; capillary solution movement forms layers of nitrates; pure nitrate forms rare veins. For more than a century, the world supply of the compound was mined almost exclusively from the Atacama desert in northern Chile until, at the turn of the 20th century, German chemists Fritz Haber and Carl Bosch developed a process for producing ammonia from the atmosphere on an industrial scale (see Haber process). With the onset of World War I, Germany began converting ammonia from this process into a synthetic Chilean saltpeter, which was as practical as the natural compound in production of gunpowder and other munitions. By the 1940s, this conversion process resulted in a dramatic decline in demand for sodium nitrate procured from natural sources.

Chile still has the largest reserves of caliche, with active mines in such locations as Valdivia, María Elena and Pampa Blanca, and there it used to be called white gold. Sodium nitrate, potassium nitrate, sodium sulfate and iodine are all obtained by the processing of caliche. The former Chilean saltpeter mining communities of Humberstone and Santa Laura were declared UNESCO World Heritage sites in 2005.

Synthesis 
Sodium nitrate is also synthesized industrially by neutralizing nitric acid with sodium carbonate or sodium bicarbonate:

2 HNO3 + Na2CO3 → 2 NaNO3 + H2O + CO2

HNO3 + NaHCO3 → NaNO3 + H2O + CO2

or also by neutralizing it with sodium hydroxide (however, this reaction is very exothermic):

HNO3 + NaOH → NaNO3 + H2O

or by mixing stoichiometric amounts of ammonium nitrate and sodium hydroxide, sodium bicarbonate or sodium carbonate:

NH4NO3 + NaOH → NaNO3 + NH4OH

NH4NO3 + NaHCO3 → NaNO3 + NH4HCO3

2NH4NO3 + Na2CO3 → 2NaNO3 + (NH4)2CO3

Uses
Most sodium nitrate is used in fertilizers, where it supplies a water-soluble form of nitrogen. Its use, which is mainly outside of high-income countries, is attractive since it does not alter the pH of the soil. Another major use is as a complement to ammonium nitrate in explosives. Molten sodium nitrate and its solutions with potassium nitrate have good thermal stability (up to 600 °C) and high heat capacities. These properties are suitable for thermally annealing metals and for storing thermal energy in solar applications.

Food 
Sodium nitrate is also a food additive used as a preservative and color fixative in cured meats and poultry; it is listed under its INS number 251 or E number E251. It is approved for use in the EU, US and Australia and New Zealand. Sodium nitrate should not be confused with sodium nitrite, which is also a common food additive and preservative used, for example, in deli meats.

Thermal storage 
Sodium nitrate has also been investigated as a phase-change material for thermal energy recovery, owing to its relatively high melting enthalpy of 178 J/g. Examples of the applications of sodium nitrate used for thermal energy storage include solar thermal power technologies and direct steam generating parabolic troughs.

Steel coating 

Sodium nitrate is used in a steel coating process in which it forms a surface magnetite layer.

Health concerns
Studies have shown a link between increased levels of nitrates and increased deaths from certain diseases including Alzheimer's disease, diabetes mellitus, stomach cancer, and Parkinson's disease: possibly through the damaging effect of nitrosamines on DNA; however, little has been done to control for other possible causes in the epidemiological results. Nitrosamines, formed in cured meats containing sodium nitrate and nitrite, have been linked to gastric cancer and esophageal cancer. Sodium nitrate and nitrite are associated with a higher risk of colorectal cancer.

Substantial evidence in recent decades, facilitated by an increased understanding of pathological processes and science, exists in support of the theory that processed meat increases the risk of colon cancer and that this is due to the nitrate content. A small amount of the nitrate added to meat as a preservative breaks down into nitrite, in addition to any nitrite that may also be added. The nitrite then reacts with protein-rich foods (such as meat) to produce carcinogenic NOCs (nitroso compounds). NOCs can be formed either when meat is cured or in the body as meat is digested.

However, several things complicate the otherwise straightforward understanding that "nitrates in food raise your risk of cancer": Commonly consumed plants are well known to be rich sources of nitrates. In fact, exposure of nitrates from plants may even be higher than meat for most people. Processed meats have no fiber, vitamins, or phytochemical antioxidants, are high in sodium, may contain high fat, and are often fried or cooked at a temperature sufficient to degrade protein into nitrosamines. Nitrates are key intermediates and effectors in the primary vasculature signaling which is necessary for all mammals to survive.

See also
 Sodium nitrite

References

Further reading

External links
CHORI CO., LTD. ：https://chori-mukifine.com/en/sodium-nitrate/
 ATSDR – Case Studies in Environmental Medicine – Nitrate/Nitrite Toxicity U.S. Department of Health and Human Services (public domain)
 FAO/WHO report
 Calculators: surface tensions, and densities, molarities and molalities of aqueous sodium nitrate

Deliquescent substances
Nitrate minerals
Nitrates
Oxidizing agents
Preservatives
Pyrotechnic oxidizers
Sodium compounds
Sodium minerals